Impoundment may refer to:

Water control
 The result of a dam, creating a body of water
 A reservoir, formed by a dam
 Coal slurry impoundment, a specialized form of such a reservoir used for coal mining and processing
 Impounded dock, an enclosed ship dock that uses locks to impound water to a consistent depth within the dock area
 Impoundment rights, a German system of permits and taxes for damming rivers

Other uses
 Impoundment of appropriated funds, the decision of a President of the United States not to spend money appropriated by Congress
 Vehicle impoundment

See also 
 Pound (disambiguation)
 Seize (disambiguation)